Budíkovice is a small village in the Czech republic, approximately 4 kilometers north of the town of Třebíč. Budíkovice is in the district of Třebíč.

The village is home to a chapel, a small swimming pool and notably just a single bus stop.

Třebíč quarters